John-Mary Kauzya (born 1957) is a Ugandan diplomat known for his research and policy advice in the areas of governance and public administration.

Kauzya is currently Chief of the Public Service Innovation Branch of the Division for Public Institutions and Digital Government at the United Nations Department of Economic and Social Affairs.

References

1957 births
Ugandan officials of the United Nations
University of Paris alumni
Ugandan diplomats
Living people